Tetsunosuke (written: 鐡之祐, 鐵之助, 鉄之助 or 哲之介) is a masculine Japanese given name. Notable people with the name include:

, Japanese page and member of Shinsengumi
, Japanese water polo player
, Japanese businessman and politician
, Japanese businessman, banker and diplomat

Japanese masculine given names